RT may refer to:

Arts and media
 RT (TV network), a Russian television news channel (formerly Russia Today)
 RT America, defunct U.S. channel (2010–2022)
 RT UK, defunct British channel (2014–2022)
 RT France, defunct French channel (2014–2022)
 RT Arabic, Arabic-language channel
 RT Spanish, Spanish-language channel
 RT Documentary, RT's documentary channel
 RT!, Canadian music-video director
 Radio Times, a British listings magazine
 Radio Thailand, a Thai public radio station
 Rooster Teeth, an entertainment production company
 Rotten Tomatoes, a review aggregator website

Science and technology

Biology and medicine
 Radiation therapy or radiotherapy
 Rapid test
 Reaction time, a term used in psychology
 Respiratory therapist
 Resuscitative thoracotomy
 Reverse transcriptase, an enzyme that transcribes RNA to DNA
 Richter's transformation, in chronic leukemia
  or effective reproduction number, a measure of the spread of an infection in epidemiology

Computing and telecommunications
 IBM RT PC, a computer
 Windows RT, for ARM processors
 Radiotechnique, a French electronics manufacturer
 Radiotelephone
 Request Tracker, a ticketing system
 Retweeting, a sharing function on Twitter
 RT-Mobile, spun off from Rostelecom in Russia

Other uses in science and technology
 RT (energy), the product of the gas constant (R) and temperature
 Relevance theory, a linguistic framework for understanding utterance interpretation

Sports
 Russian Time, a Russian motor racing team
 Right tackle, in American and Canadian football

Transportation
 R/T (Road/Track), a Dodge car performance designator
 AEC Regent III RT, London Transport bus, 1938–1979
 Rapid transit
 Line 3 Scarborough of the Toronto Subway, Scarborough RT or "The RT"
 Sacramento Regional Transit District, SacRT or RT
 RT, abbreviation for route number in the US
 Airline UVT Aero (IATA code RT)

Other uses
 Ruby Tuesday (restaurant) (NYSE symbol), a restaurant chain
 Rukun tetangga, an administrative division of Indonesia

See also
 Real-time (disambiguation)
 The Right Honourable, abbreviated "Rt Hon"
 Arty (disambiguation)
 RT1 (disambiguation)